Krabi is one of the southern provinces (changwat) of Thailand, on the shore of the Andaman Sea. Neighbouring provinces are (from north clockwise) Phang Nga, Surat Thani, Nakhon Si Thammarat, and Trang. Phuket province lies to the west across Phang Nga Bay. Krabi town is the seat of the provincial government.

Geography

The area is dotted with solitary limestone peaks, known as mogotes, both on land and in the sea. Rock climbers from all over travel to Ton Sai Beach and Railay Beach. The beaches form part of Krabi's Phra Nang Peninsula. Of the 154 islands in the province, Ko Phi Phi Le is the most famous, as it was the site of the movie The Beach. Other notable islands include Ko Phi Phi Don, part of the Phi Phi Islands, and Ko Lanta, a larger island to the south. The coast was damaged by the tsunami of 26 December 2004.

Krabi's mogotes contain many caves, most having speleothems such as stalactites and stalagmites. Tham Chao Le and Tham Phi Hua To, both in Ao Luek District, contain prehistoric rock-paintings depicting humans, animals, and geometrical shapes. In Lang Rong Rien cave in 1986 archaeologists found 40,000-year-old human artifacts: stone tools, pottery, and bones. It is one of the oldest traces of human occupation in Southeast Asia. Krabi's caves are one of the main sources of nests of the edible-nest swiftlet, used in the making of bird's nest soup.

Krabi's farmland is dominated by a duopoly of rubber and palm oil plantations. Palm plantations alone occupy  or 52 percent of the province's farmland. Together, palm oil and rubber cover 95 percent of Krabi's cultivated area with many smallholder farms amidst industrial plantations.

History
Circa 1200 CE, Krabi was tributary to the Kingdom of Ligor, a city on the Kra Peninsula's east coast, better known today as Nakhon Si Thammarat. In modern times, Krabi was administered from Nakhon Si Thammarat, even after 1872 when King Chulalongkorn granted Krabi town status. In 1875 it was made a direct subordinate of Bangkok, becoming what is now a province. In 1900 the governor  moved the seat of the province from Ban Talad Kao to its present location at the mouth of the Krabi River.

Symbols

The provincial slogan is, "Krabi, the liveable city, friendly people."

The provincial tree is the blue sky (Thai: thung-fa ทุ้งฟ้า) or Alstonia macrophylla.

Administrative divisions

Provincial government
Krabi is subdivided into eight districts (amphoe), which are further divided into 53 subdistricts (tambon) and 374 villages (muban).

Local government
As of 26 November 2019 there are: one Krabi Provincial Administration Organisation and 13 municipal (thesaban) areas in the province. Krabi has town (thesaban mueang) status. Further 12 subdistrict municipalities (thesaban tambon). The non-municipal areas are administered by 48 Subdistrict Administrative Organisations - SAO (ongkan borihan suan tambon).

Population and culture 
Krabi's population includes Buddhists, Thai-Chinese, Moken (sea gypsies), and Muslims. Population is most dense in the coastal area in Nuea Khlong District and Krabi city districts, both with population densities above 150 people per km2. The least densely populated area is the inland mountain Khao Phanom District at 61 persons per km2. Buddhism is the religion most observed (65 percent) followed by Islam (34 percent). Traditionally Krabi's inhabitants worked in agriculture, for the province is rich in rubber, palm oil, and oranges. In recent years tourism has become an important source of income.

Economy
Agriculture, tourism, and, to a lesser extent, fisheries, form the backbone of Krabi's economy. Rubber is the primary cash crop of the province, followed by palm oil. Thailand's largest producer of palm oil products, Univanich Palm Oil PCL, is headquartered in Krabi. It employs 1,000 persons directly and purchases feed stock from 2,000 small and medium-sized Krabi growers.

Tourism

Krabi province ranks fifth in tourism income in Thailand with six million arrivals. Only Bangkok, Phuket, Chonburi, and Chiang Mai earn more from tourism. Arrivals are concentrated from November to April. The crush of high-season visitors has come at considerable cost to the environment. Local authorities have devised a program, "Krabi 365 Days" to move some high-season visitors to the off-season, from May to October, called the "green season" by tourism officials, partly due to the seasonal rains. Tourism revenue has grown at an average of eight percent annually. In 2018, tourism income is expected to hit 100 billion baht, up from 96 billion in 2017. The top visitors are Chinese and Malaysians. Scandinavians number in the top five visiting nationalities. According to the Tourism Authority of Thailand (TAT)  there are 460 hotels in the province, with some 200 additional hotels in the process of being licensed and another 200 in the preliminary stages of consideration.

Transport
Since 1999 the province has been served by the international Krabi International Airport.

Phetkasem Road (Thailand Route 4) passes through the province.

Human achievement index 2017

Since 2003, United Nations Development Programme (UNDP) in Thailand has tracked progress on human development at sub-national level using the Human achievement index (HAI), a composite index covering all the eight key areas of human development. National Economic and Social Development Board (NESDB) has taken over this task since 2017.

Environment

In mid-2015, government plans to build an 800 megawatt coal-fired electricity generating station (EGAT Coal-Fired TH #3) in Tambon Pakasai in Amphoe Nuea Khlong have generated protests and hunger strikes by those opposed to the plant who say that it would endanger Krabi's relatively pristine environment. The Electricity Generating Authority of Thailand (EGAT) has pushed forward with development. The government intends to start the bidding process without an environmental assessment in order to "save time". The Krabi site is one of nine coal-fired plants planned for southern Thailand to be constructed over the next two decades to off-set the depletion of natural gas fields in the Gulf of Thailand. Opponents of the plan say their demands—which include a three-year waiting period to see if the province can produce 100 percent renewable energy—have been ignored.

Thailand's resolve to go ahead with the massive new coal-fired power station in Krabi, a 315 MWe, 48 billion baht undertaking, presents a problem. Coal is a major source of mercury poisoning and has been found in toxic amounts up to 12 times more than the maximum acceptable dose in the inhabitants of Tha Thum in Prachinburi province. Possible vectors are fly ash from the local coal power plant, coal dust from outdoor coal storage piles, or coal ash, used as fertiliser. These present risks to Krabi. Coal pollution mitigation technology, sometimes called "clean coal", is still in its infancy and at the moment can only handle sulphur dioxide, nitrogen oxides, and particulates. Carbon dioxide sequestering is much more complex and costly. Two academics, referring to coal pollution mitigation in general, point out that, "So-called 'clean coal' is expensive, untested, unwieldy and unworkable, yet it is raised as a panacea."

In mid-2016, a pro-renewables working group in Krabi published a "Green Power Development Plan". It concludes that Krabi province can depend on renewables—mainly biomass and biogas—for 100 percent of its electricity needs. The report calculates that biomass could generate 118 MW in an initial  three-year period; solar could generate 55 MW; biogas, 54 MW; and wind energy 40 MW. During a subsequent three-year period, renewables could generate 287 MW, exceeding the province's peak demand year of 2015, when it consumed 143 MW. If adopted, the plan would obviate the need to import coal, saving 175 billion baht over a 25-year period.

In August 2016, EGAT solicited bids for the plant's construction and received bids in the range of 32–34.9 billion baht. The bidding process and the environmental and health impact assessment report were completed simultaneously. "After being delayed for almost two years, this November [2016]  will be the time to decide whether to proceed or scrap the plan," said Energy Minister Gen Anantaporn Kanjanarat.

EGAT power plant opponents in Krabi have formed a coalition of local administration officials, academics, businesspersons, and concerned citizens that is proving to be a formidable opponent of EGAT's fossil fueled plans. Krabi is a leading tourist destination on the Andaman Coast. Local government has described coal as "filthy" and in conflict with tourism. The province has set itself the goal of being "...solely dependent on renewable energy."

Projected impact of changes in climate

In a 2008 study of the impact of climate change on Krabi province to the year 2033, the following effects were projected:

 Temperature: The study forecasts modest temperature changes, slightly more than 1˚C at inland locations over the next 10–25 years. Coastal temperatures are projected to rise slightly less than 1˚C.
 Rainfall: Annual monsoons will be two weeks shorter by 2018 and four weeks shorter by 2033. Total rainfall may decrease by 10 percent by 2033 according to the study.
 Sea level: Sea level will rise substantially, with negative implications for Krabi's mangrove wetlands. The rise of mean sea level on the Krabi coastline is projected to rise by about 1 cm annually over the next 25 years. A sea level rise of 20 cm over the next 25 years would cause existing (2008) shorelines will retreat 10–35 m.
 Tropical storms: Fewer cyclones are forecasted, although higher sea levels may result in storms doing more damage to coastal infrastructure.

National parks
There are four national parks, along with sixteen other national parks, make up region 5 (Nakhon Si Thammarat) of Thailand's protected areas. 
 Hat Noppharat Thara–Mu Ko Phi Phi National Park is a marine national park. Established on 6 October 1983, it is an IUCN Category II protected area with coral reefs, and an area measuring 242,437 rai ~ . and covers Mueang Krabi district.

 Mu Ko Lanta National Park is a national park in the southern part of Krabi province, consisting of several islands.  The two largest islands are Ko Lanta Noi and Ko Lanta Yai. Although both are inhabited, Ko Lanta Yai is the primary tourist destination. The park was established on 15 August 1990, with an area of 83,750 rai ~ .

 Than Bok Khorani National Park is established on 30 September 1998, with an area of 65,000 rai ~ . Different parts are on the mainland in Ao Luek district, along with several archipelagos in Mueang Krabi district: Ko Chong Lat, Ko Ka Rot and an archipelago east of Ko Yai Noi, with among others, Ko Pakbia, Ko Lao Lading and Ko Hong. 
 Khao Phanom Bencha National Park is in Khao Phanom and Ao Luek districts, established on 9 July 1981 with an area of 31,325 rai ~ .

Wildlife sanctuaries
There are two wildlife sanctuaries, along with two other wildlife sanctuaries, make up region 5 (Nakhon Si Thammarat) of Thailand's protected areas. 
 Khao Pra–Bang Khram Wildlife Sanctuary is in Khlong Tom and Lam Thap district. Area is 97,700 rai ~ .
 Khlong Phraya Wildlife Sanctuary is in Plai Phraya and Ao Luek district and occupies an area of 95,988 rai ~  and borders Khao Phanom Bencha national park to the south.

Sport
Football

Krabi football club participates in Thai League 3 Lower Region, the third tier of Thai football league system. The Andaman Eagles (Thai:อินทรีอันดามัน) plays their home matches at Krabi Provincial Stadium.

Gallery

References

External links

Provincial Website 
Golden Jubilee Network province guide 

 
Provinces of Thailand
Southern Thailand
Strait of Malacca